Jeanne Marie-Madeleine Demessieux (13 February 1921 – 11 November 1968) was a French organist, pianist, composer, and teacher. She was the chief organist at Saint-Esprit for 29 years and at La Madeleine in Paris starting in 1962. She performed internationally as a concert organist and was the first female organist to sign a record contract. She went on to record many organ works, including her own compositions.

Biography
Born in Montpellier (Hérault) Jeanne Demessieux was the second child of Marie-Madeleine Demessieux (née Mézy) and Étienne Demessieux. After taking private piano lessons with her elder sister, Yolande, Jeanne entered the Montpellier Conservatoire in 1928. Four years later, she obtained first prizes in solfège and piano. In 1933, she began her studies at the Paris Conservatoire; studying piano with Simon Riera and Magda Tagliaferro, harmony with Jean Gallon, counterpoint and fugue with Noël Gallon, and composition with Henri Büsser. The same year, she was appointed titular organist at Saint-Esprit, a post she held for 19 years.

From 1936-39, Demessieux studied organ privately with Marcel Dupré, whose organ class at the Conservatoire she joined in 1939. After receiving a first prize in organ performance and improvisation in 1941, Demessieux studied privately with Dupré for five more years, before she played her début concert at the Salle Pleyel in Paris in 1946, as part of a series of 12 solo concerts between 1946 and 1948. This was the beginning of her career as an international concert organist and improviser, but also coinciding with Dupré irrevocably turning his back on Demessieux. In 1947, she became the first female organist to sign a record contract, with a performance of Toccata and Fugue in D minor, BWV 565 for Decca Records. She gave more than 700 concerts in France, the United Kingdom, Belgium, the Netherlands, Switzerland, Germany, and the United States (1953, 1955, and 1958). Demessieux always performed from memory, having an active repertoire of more than 2,500 compositions, including the complete organ works of Bach, Franck, the major organ works of Liszt and Mendelssohn, and all of Dupré's organ works up to Opus 41. A prolific recording artist, she was awarded the Grand Prix du Disque Award in 1961 for her complete recording of Franck's organ works (1959, a world premiere recording).

In 1962, Demessieux was appointed as titular organist at La Madeleine in Paris. She combined this with demanding academic duties, serving as professor of organ and improvisation at the Nancy Conservatoire (1950–1952) and the Conservatoire Royal in Liège (1952–1968). Among her students were Marie-Madeleine Duruflé, Pierre Labric, and Louis Thiry. In 1967, after several years of negotiations, she signed a contract with Decca Records for a recording of the complete organ works by Olivier Messiaen at Notre-Dame de Paris, with which she could not comply to due to health reasons. According to her biographer, Christiane Trieu-Colleney, Demessieux underwent medical treatment and did not perform in concert for most of the last year of her life. Jeanne Demessieux died on November 11, 1968 in Paris, at age 47, from throat cancer. She was buried in the Demessieux family tomb in the Cimetière du Grau-du-Roi, not far from Aigues-Mortes.

Demessieux wrote more than 30 compositions. A third of these were written for the organ, but she also produced pieces for piano, numerous songs, a handful of choral works (including an oratorio, La Chanson de Roland), and orchestral works. About half of her output has been published as of 2021. In 2021, Decca Records released an 8-CD box set with her complete recordings for this label between 1947 and 1967, including the above-mentioned 1959 world-premiere recording of Franck's complete organ works.

Compositions

Organ solo
Nativité, op. 4 (Composed in 1943/44. Sampzon: Delatour France, 2005).
Six Études, op. 5 (Composed in 1944. Paris: Bornemann/Leduc, 1946).
Pointes
 Tierces
 Sixtes
 Accords alternés
 Notes répétées
 Octaves
Sept Méditations sur le Saint-Esprit, op. 6 (Composed in 1945–47. Paris: Durand, 1947).
Veni Sancte Spiritus
 Les Eaux
 Pentecôte
 Dogme
 Consolateur
 Paix
 Lumière
Triptyque, op. 7 (Composed in 1947. Paris: Durand, 1949).
Prélude
 Adagio
 Fugue
Twelve Choral-Preludes on Gregorian Chant Themes, op. 8 (Composed in 1947. Boston, MA: McLaughlin & Reilly, 1950, reissued by Summy-Birchard in 1995).
Rorate Caeli (aka. Rorate Coeli)
 Adeste Fideles
 Attende Domine
 Stabat Mater
 Vexilla Regis
 Hosanna filio David
 O Filii
 Veni Creator Spiritus
 Ubi caritas
 In manus tuas
 Tu es Petrus
 Domine Jesu
Andante (Chant donné) (Composed in 1953. In: 64 Leçons d'Harmonie, offertes en hommage à Jean Gallon, edited by Claude Delvincourt. Paris: Durand, 1953).
Te Deum, op. 11 (Composed in 1957/58. Paris: Durand, 1959).
 Répons pour le temps de pâques: Victimae paschali laudes (Composed in 1962/63. Paris: Durand, 1970).
Répons pour les temps liturgiques (Composed in 1962–66. Sampzon: Delatour France, 2006).
Répons pour le temps du Très-Saint-Rosaire: Ave Maria.
 Répons pour le temps d'Advent: Consolamini.
 Répons pour le temps du Saint-Sacrement: Lauda Sion (First version, composed in 1963).
 Répons pour le temps du Saint-Sacrement: Lauda Sion (Second version, composed in 1966).
Prélude et fugue en ut, op. 13 (Composed in 1964. Paris: Durand, 1965).

Organ and orchestra
Poème, op. 9 (Composed in 1949. Paris: Durand, 1952).

Piano solo
 7 Pièces inédites (Sampzon: Delatour France, 2011).
Le Chant des petits oiseaux
 Berceuse et impromptu
 Romance sans paroles
 Allegro
 Mazurka
 Valse n° 1
 Murmure des bois
Berceuse (Composed in 1926. Unpublished).
Suite (Composed in 1938. Unpublished).
Prélude
 Scherzetto
 Menuet
 Toccata
Étude in F# major (Composed in 1938. Unpublished).
Trois préludes (Composed in 1939. Unpublished).
D# minor
 B minor
 D minor

Songs (with piano)
Le Moulin (Composed in 1937. Unpublished).
Soudainement contre les Vitres (Composed in 1940. Unpublished).
Sonnet de Michel-Ange (Composed in 1949. Unpublished.)
Action de grâce (No date. Unpublished).
Cavalier (No date. Unpublished).
Le Vase brisé (No date. Unpublished).

Chamber music
Sonata for violin and piano (Composed in 1940. Sampson: Delatour France, 2013).
Allegro moderato
 Adagio cantabile
 Thème et variations
Ballade, op. 12, for horn and piano (Composed in 1962. Paris: Durand, 1962).
String quartet (No date. Unpublished).

Vocal music
Cantate pour le jeudi Saint for chorus, soloists, and organ; text by Félix Raugel (Composed in 1938. Unpublished).
Barques célestes for three women's voices a capella (Composed in 1938. Unpublished).
Consolamini for five mixed voices a capella (Composed in 1950. Unpublished).
La Chanson de Roland, op. 10, oratorio for chorus, mezzo-soprano, and orchestra (Composed in 1951–56. Paris: Leduc).

Miscellaneous
Two symphonic movements for orchestra (Composed in 1941. Unpublished).
George Frideric Handel: Cadenzas for Organ Concertos Nos. 1 and 2 (Unpublished).
Franz Liszt: Funérailles, arranged for organ solo (Sampzon: Delatour France, 2010).

Discography 
 Jeanne Demessieux: L'oeuvre pour orgue.
 Te Deum op. 11, Répons pour le temps de Pâques, 12 Choral-Préludes op. 8, Triptyque op. 7, Prélude et Fugue en Ut op. 13, Sept Méditations sur le Saint-Esprit op. 6, Six Etudes op. 5. Pierre Labric: Hommage à Jeanne Demessieux.
 Pierre Labric, Organist. Recorded in July 1971 (Te Deum), December 1971 (Choral-Preludes, Répons), October 1972 (Méditations, Études), November 1972 (Triptyque, Prélude et Fugue) and April 1974 (Hommage) at St. Ouen, Rouen, and St. Pierre, Angoulème (Six Études, Sept Méditations). Sigean: Solstice, 2017. 2 CD's.
 Jeanne Demessieux: The Decca Legacy.
 Her complete recordings for Decca Records between 1947 and 1967.
 Jeanne Demessieux, Organist. London: Decca Records, 2021. 8 CD's.
 Jeanne Demessieux: Pièces pour orgue.
 Six Etudes op. 5, Méditations sur le Saint-Esprit op. 6 (Nos. 2 & 7), Triptyque op. 7, Attende Domine (Choral-Preludes op. 8), Te Deum op. 11. Pierre Labric: Hommage à Jeanne Demessieux (first movement).
 Pierre Labric, Organist. Recorded in 1969 and 1972 at Notre-Dame de Paris. Sigean: Solstice, 2010. 1 CD.
 Jeanne Demessieux: Complete Organ Works.
 Nativité op. 4, Six Études op. 5, Sept Méditations sur le Saint-Esprit op. 6, Triptyque op. 7, 12 Choral-Préludes op. 8, Te Deum op. 11, Répons pour les Temps Liturgiques, Prélude et Fugue en Ut op. 13. 
 Maxime Patel, Organist. Recorded in August 2006 at the Jann Organs of the Stiftsbasilika Waldsassen, Germany. A film production by Federico Savio. Hombourg-Haut, France: Fugatto, 2008. 1 DVD.
 Jeanne Demessieux: Complete Organ Works.
 Nativité op. 4, Six Études op. 5, Sept Méditations sur le Saint-Esprit op. 6, Triptyque op. 7, 12 Choral-Préludes op. 8, Te Deum op. 11, Répons pour les Temps Liturgiques, Prélude et Fugue en Ut op. 13, Andante (Chant donné), Poème op. 9 for organ and orchestra.
 Stephen Tharp, Organist. Recorded in June 2004 at St. Martin, Dudelange (Luxembourg; opp. 4, 5, 8, 11, 13, and Andante), and in May 2006 at St. Ouen, Rouen (opp. 6 and 7, Répons pour les Temps Liturgiques). Jeanne Demessieux, Organist/Orchestre Radio-Symphonique de Paris, direction: Eugène Bigot (Poème op. 9). Recorded in 1952 at Salle Pleyel, Paris. Korschenbroich, Germany: Aeolus Music, 2008. 2 SACD's & 1 CD.
 César Franck: The complete works for organ.
 Jeanne Demessieux, Organ. Recorded in July 1959 at the Cavaillé-Coll-Orgel of La Madeleine in Paris, France. Amersfoort, Netherlands: Festivo, n. d. FECD 155/156. 2 CD's.
 Jeanne Demessieux aux grandes orgues de l'Eglise de la Madeleine à Paris, Vol. I.
 J. S. Bach: Sinfonia from Cantata No. 29, Erbarm dich mein, o Herre Gott BWV 721, O Mensch, bewein dein Sünde groß BWV 622, Christ unser Herr zum Jordan kam BWV 684; W. A. Mozart: Fantasia in F minor K. 608; F. Liszt: Prelude and Fugue on the name BACH; Ch. M. Widor: Allegro from Symphony No. 6 in G minor.
 Jeanne Demessieux, Organ. Recorded in July 1958 at the Cavaillé-Coll-Orgel of La Madeleine in Paris, France. Amersfoort, Netherlands: Festivo, n. d. FECD 131. 1 CD.
 Jeanne Demessieux aux grandes orgues de l'Eglise de la Madeleine à Paris, Vol. II.
 J. S. Bach: Toccata and Fugue in F Major BWV 540, Fantasia in G major BWV 572; W. A. Mozart: Adagio and Fugue in C minor K. 546/426; E. Mignan: Toccata Médiévale; J. Berveiller: Mouvement; J. Demessieux: Te Deum op. 11.
 Jeanne Demessieux, Organ. Recorded in July 1958 at the Cavaillé-Coll-Orgel of La Madeleine in Paris, France. Amersfoort, Netherlands: Festivo, n. d. FECD 132. 1 CD.
 The Legendary Jeanne Demessieux, Vol. III.
 O. Messiaen: Transports de joie (L'Ascension); J. S. Bach: Liebster Jesu, wir sind hier BWV 731; J. Berveiller: Mouvement; Ch. M. Widor: Toccata from Symphony No. 5 in F minor; W. A. Mozart: Fantasia in F minor K. 608; J. S. Bach: Toccata, Adagio and Fugue in C major BWV 564; F. Liszt: Ad nos, ad salutarem undam.
 Jeanne Demessieux, Organ. Recorded on 6 July 1961 at the Müller-Orgel of St. Bavo, Haarlem (Mozart), on 23 July 1963 at the organ of the Oude Kerk in Amsterdam (Bach: BWV 564), at Victoria Hall in Geneva (1963; Liszt: Ad nos), and the Metropolitan Cathedral in Liverpool (1967; Messiaen; Bach: BWV 731; Berveiller and Widor). Amersfoort, Netherlands: Festivo, n. d. FECD 141. 1 CD.
 The Legendary Jeanne Demessieux: The Hamburg Organs.
 St. Sophienkirche: H. Purcell: Trumpet Tune; J. S. Bach: Praeludium and Fugue in A minor BWV 543, Liebster Jesu, wir sind hier BWV 731. St. Michaelis: C. Franck: Prélude, Fugue et Variation op. 18, Cantabile (Trios Pièces). Christianskirche: J. Berveiller: Mouvement; J. Demessieux: Te Deum op. 11, Consolateur (Sept Méditation sur le Saint Esprit op. 6), Tierces (Six Études op. 5); O. Messiaen: Dieu parmi nous (La Nativité du Seigneur); J. Demessieux: Improvisation on the Choral "O großer Gott der Treu" from Cantata No. 46 of J. S. Bach.
 Jeanne Demessieux, Organ. Recorded in May 1959 (St. Sophienkirche), in November 1962 (St. Michaelis), and June 1958 (Christianskirche). Amersfoort, Netherlands: Festivo, n. d. FECD 6961/862. 1 CD.
 Jeanne Demessieux: Complete Organ Works.
 Te Deum op. 11, Répons pour le temps de Pâques, 12 Choral-Préludes op. 8, Triptyque op. 7, Prélude et Fugue en Ut op. 13, Sept Méditations sur le Saint-Esprit op. 6, Six Etudes op. 5. Pierre Labric: Hommage à Jeanne Demessieux.
 Pierre Labric, Organist. Recorded in July and December 1971 and October 1972 at St. Ouen, Rouen, and St. Pierre, Angoulème (Six Études, Sept Méditations). Musical Heritage Society, 1974.

References

Bibliography 
 Aprahamian, Felix. Jeanne Demessieux. In Felix Aprahamian (ed.): Diaries and selected writings on music. Woodbridge, Suffolk: The Boydell Press, 2015, 375-376.
 Association des Amis de l'Orgue (ed.). Jeanne Demessieux: Journal (1934-1946). L'Orgue 287-288 (2009).
 Association Maurice et Marie-Madeleine Duruflé (ed.). Hommage à Jeanne Demessieux. Bulletin no. 9 (2009).
 Ballesteros, Domitila. Jeanne Demessieux’s ‘Six Etudes’ and the piano technique. Rio de Janeiro, Brazil (2004).
 
 Cavanagh, Lynn. The rise and fall of a famous collaboration: Marcel Dupré and Jeanne Demessieux. The Diapason (July 2005): 18–21.
 Chevalier, Éliane. Marie-Madeleine Chevalier-Duruflé et Marcel Dupré. In Association Maurice et Marie-Madeleine Duruflé (ed.): Marie-Madeleine Chevalier-Duruflé. Bulletin no. 17 (2019-2020), 39-41.
 Colleney, Christiane. In memoriam Jeanne Demessieux (1921-1968). Vingtième anniversaire. Jeunesse et Orgue 70 (1988): 9-10.
 Demessieux, Jeanne. Journal (1934–1946). L’Orgue: Bulletin des Amis de l’Orgue 287–288 (2009): 64–247.
 Denis, Pierre. Les organistes français d'aujourd'hui: Jeanne Demessieux, organiste du Saint-Esprit, professeur du Conservatoire Royal de Liège. L’Orgue 75 (April/June 1955): 37-44.
 Ellis, Laura. The American recital tours of Jeanne Demessieux. The Diapason 86 (October 1995): 14-18.
 Haiawi, Maryam. Das Orgelwerk von Jeanne Demessieux (1921–1968). Musica sacra 135, no. 6 (2015): 328–330.
 Haiawi, Maryam. Die Sept Méditations sur le Saint-Esprit von Jeanne Demessieux (1921–1968): Kompositionsstil und theologischer Gehalt. Ars Organi 65, no. 2, (June 2017): 90–96.
 Labric, Pierre. Jeanne Demessieux (1921-1968): Pariser Orgellegende von La Madeleine. Organ – Journal für die Orgel 2, no. 2 (1999): 36–38.
 Labric, Pierre. Jeanne Demessieux: Présentation des œuvres pour orgue. In Association Maurice et Marie-Madeleine Duruflé (ed.): Hommage à Jeanne Demessieux. Bulletin no. 9 (2009), 70–75.
 Labric, Pierre. Jeanne Demessieux: Analyse de l'œuvre pour orgue. In Association Maurice et Marie-Madeleine Duruflé (ed.): Hommage à Jeanne Demessieux. Bulletin no. 9 (2009), 76–96.
 Machart, Renaud. Jeanne Demessieux (1921-1968). In Renaud Machart and Vincent Warnier (ed.): Les grands organistes du XXe siècle. Paris: Buchet-Chastel, 2018, 157-164.
 Marchais, Christine. Jeanne Demessieux. In Association Femmes et Musique (ed.): Compositrices Françaises au XXème siècle, vol. 2. Sampzon: Delatour France, 2014, 65-66.
 Page, Barnaby. Jeanne Demessieux. Organists' Review (September 2018): 9-13.
 Steed, Graham. Dupre and Demessieux: The master and the pupil. The American Organist 13 (March 1979): 36-37.
 Tréfouel, Dominique. Jeanne Demessieux. Lyon, France: J2C/ALDRUI Éditions, 2005. .
 Trieu-Colleney, Christiane. Jeanne Demessieux: Une vie de luttes et de gloire. Avignon, France: Les Presses Universelles, 1977.
 D'Arcy Trinkwon. The legend of Jeanne Demessieux: a study.  The Diapason (November 2008): 30-33.
 Welzel, Martin. Jeanne Demessieux (1921–1968): A critical examination of her life. DMA Dissertation, University of Washington, Seattle, 2005. ResearchGate

External links 
 Musica et Memoria: Jeanne Demessieux
 Jeanne Demessieux - Festivo Label, Amersfoort, Netherlands
 Jeanne Demessieux - Éditions Delatour France 
 Lynn Cavanagh. Introducing the French post-romantic style of organ music to students: Demessieux's Twelve Choral Preludes on Gregorian chant themes. Published online October 1, 2002 (visited February 11, 2021).
 Lynn Cavanagh. The rise and fall of a famous collaboration: Marcel Dupré and Jeanne Demessieux, Part 1. The Diapason (June 2005) (visited February 11, 2021).
 Lynn Cavanagh. The rise and fall of a famous collaboration: Marcel Dupré and Jeanne Demessieux, Part 2. The Diapason (June 2005) (visited February 11, 2021).

1921 births
1968 deaths
20th-century classical composers
20th-century French women classical pianists
Conservatoire de Paris alumni
Academic staff of the Royal Conservatory of Liège
French classical composers
French women classical composers
French composers of sacred music
Composers for pipe organ
Organ improvisers
French classical organists
Musicians from Montpellier
Deaths from cancer in France
Grand Prix du Disque winners
Women organists
20th-century organists
20th-century French composers
20th-century women composers